Mostowfi ol-Mamalek was One of the positions and titles of the Iranian court from the Ilkhanid period to the Qajar era.

Mostowfi ol-Mamalek was the leader of all Mostowfis. During the Safavid period, Mostowfi ol-Mamalek was in charge of the finances of the whole country and all the financial and tax affairs of the country and the dismissal and installation of the Mostowfis were done by him. Mostowfi ol-Mamalek was a powerful official during this period, and at the end of Sultan Husayn's term they had the right to participate in the Supreme State Council.

After his coronation, Nader Shah divided the position of Mostowfi ol-Mamalek among four people and appointed each of them to be in charge of the finances of a part of the country, but during Karim Khan Zand Reign, this position was again given to one person. At the beginning of the Qajar period, with the expansion of the Qajar bureaucracy, Mostowfi ol-Mamalek became the second prime minister after the Shah. One of the most influential political-noble families of Iran in the Qajar period named Mostowfian Ashtiani family took their name from this title.

List of Mostowfi ol-Mamaleks of Iran

Four Mostowfis in Afsharid period 

 Mirza Mohamad Ali Mostowfi, Mostowfi of Fars
 Mirza Ali Asghar Mostowfi, Mostowfi of Khorasan
 Mirza Shafi Tabrizi, Mostowfi of Azarbaijan
 Mirza Bagher Khorasani, Mostowfi of Iraq

Zand period 

 Mirza Mohamad Brojerdi, 1762-1781
 Mirza Mohamad Sadeq Mostowfi ol-Mamalek, 1781-1794

Qajar period 

 Mirza Mohammad Zaki Ali Abadi, Mostowfi ol-Mamalek of Agha Mohammad Khan Qajar
 Mirza Yousof Ashrafi, Mostowfi ol-Mamalek in early Fath Ali Shah Qajar period
 Hajji Mohammad Hossein Isfahani, 1806-1813
 Abdullah Khan Amin al-Dawla, 1813-1823
 Mirza Mohammad Ali Ashtiani, 1823-1826
 Mirza Abul'Qasem Mostowfi ol-Mamalek, 1826-1830s
 Mirza Hassan Mostowfi ol-Mamalek Ashtiani, 1830s-1845
 Mirza Yusuf Ashtiani, 1845-1884
 Mirza Hasan Ashtiani Mostowfi ol-Mamalek, 1884-1925 (Abolish the title by Reza Shah)

References 

 
Titles in Iran
Court titles